Girardinichthys is a genus of splitfins that are endemic to Mexico. These highly threatened fish are native to the upper Lerma and Balsas basins, as well as water systems in the Valley of Mexico. Through man-made channels G. viviparus has been able to spread to the upper Pánuco River basin. The name of this genus honours the American herpetologist and ichthyologist Charles Girard (1822-1895).

Species
There are currently three recognized species in this genus:

 Girardinichthys ireneae Radda & M. K. Meyer, 2003
 Girardinichthys multiradiatus (Meek, 1904) (Dark-edged Splitfin, Golden Sailfin Goodeid)
 Girardinichthys viviparus (Bustamante, 1837) (Chapultepec Splitfin, mexclapique)

References 

 
Goodeinae
Freshwater fish of Mexico
Endemic fish of Mexico
Freshwater fish genera
Taxa named by Pieter Bleeker
Ray-finned fish genera
Taxonomy articles created by Polbot